Jan Železný (born 16 June 1966) is a Czech former track and field athlete who competed in the javelin throw. Widely considered to be the greatest javelin thrower of the modern era, he also has the fourth, fifth and sixth best performances of all time. He broke the world record a total of four times.

Biography 
Železný was born in Mladá Boleslav, Czechoslovakia. He won the silver medal in the 1988 Olympics and the gold medal at the 1992, 1996 and 2000 Summer Olympic Games. He won World Championship titles in 1993, 1995 and 2001.

On 26 March 1997 in Stellenbosch, South Africa, he threw over the 90-metre barrier five times in a single meet. Until September 2020, he was also the only athlete to throw more than 95 metres with the new type of javelin, something he achieved three times.

During his career, Železný had many great battles against the likes of Steve Backley, Sergey Makarov, Boris Henry, Seppo Räty, Raymond Hecht and Aki Parviainen.

He took leave of his career on 19 September 2006 on exhibition in Mladá Boleslav, the place where he started with athletics.

Železný coaches Vítězslav Veselý and is the former coach of Barbora Špotáková.

Four days after winning a gold medal at the 1996 Olympics, Železný had a tryout as a baseball pitcher with the Atlanta Braves at Fulton County Stadium. Both Železný and the Braves treated the tryout seriously and not as a "publicity stunt" or "sideshow," though Železný had no baseball experience beyond throwing a ball at home with his young son.

International competitions

See also 
List of multiple Olympic gold medalists in one event
 List of European records in athletics

References 

1966 births
Living people
Sportspeople from Mladá Boleslav
Czechoslovak male javelin throwers
Czech male javelin throwers
Czech athletics coaches
Olympic athletes of Czechoslovakia
Olympic silver medalists for Czechoslovakia
Olympic gold medalists for Czechoslovakia
Athletes (track and field) at the 1988 Summer Olympics
Athletes (track and field) at the 1992 Summer Olympics
Olympic athletes of the Czech Republic
Olympic gold medalists for the Czech Republic
Athletes (track and field) at the 1996 Summer Olympics
Athletes (track and field) at the 2000 Summer Olympics
Athletes (track and field) at the 2004 Summer Olympics
World Athletics Championships athletes for Czechoslovakia
World Athletics Championships athletes for the Czech Republic
World Athletics Championships medalists
European Athletics Championships medalists
World Athletics record holders
Recipients of Medal of Merit (Czech Republic)
International Olympic Committee members
Medalists at the 2000 Summer Olympics
Medalists at the 1996 Summer Olympics
Medalists at the 1992 Summer Olympics
Medalists at the 1988 Summer Olympics
Olympic gold medalists in athletics (track and field)
Olympic silver medalists in athletics (track and field)
Goodwill Games medalists in athletics
European Athlete of the Year winners
World Athletics Championships winners
Competitors at the 2001 Goodwill Games
Goodwill Games gold medalists in athletics